Lieutenant-Colonel Henry Breedon Everard GCLM ICD DSO TD (21 February 1897 – 7 August 1980) was a railway engineer and executive who briefly became the Acting President of Rhodesia during the U.D.I. period.

Everard was born in Barnet and educated at Marlborough College and graduated from Trinity College, Cambridge in 1922. During the First World War he served in France with the Rifle Brigade, where he was wounded in combat and reached the rank of captain. He worked as a railway engineer from 1922, but was commissioned again on the outbreak of the Second World War, this time in the Sherwood Foresters; he was taken prisoner by German forces, awarded the Distinguished Service Order, and reached the rank of lieutenant-colonel. When repatriated after the war he became an executive of British Railways.

In 1953 Everard moved to Bulawayo, Southern Rhodesia to become General Manager of Rhodesia Railways, which he remained for five years before retiring. He supported the Rhodesian Front and stood in for Clifford Dupont (who had been made "Officer Administering the Government") in 1968–69. Following the proclamation of a republic, Everard was Acting President on three occasions between 1975 and 1979.

His maternal first cousin was the eminent scientist Professor Naomi Datta; their maternal grandfather's first cousins were architect Henry Goddard and Mormon pioneer George Goddard.

References

Primary sources
Encyclopaedia Rhodesia (The College Press, Salisbury, 1973)

1897 births
1980 deaths
People educated at Marlborough College
Alumni of Trinity College, Cambridge
White Rhodesian people
Rifle Brigade officers
Sherwood Foresters officers
British Army personnel of World War I
British Army personnel of World War II
Companions of the Distinguished Service Order
Rhodesian businesspeople
Rhodesian politicians
Presidents of Rhodesia
World War II prisoners of war held by Germany
British Rail people
British emigrants to Rhodesia
People from Chipping Barnet
Military personnel from Hertfordshire